The Victorian Railways H class was a class of  light line passenger locomotives operated by the Victorian Railways between 1877 and 1916.

History
Classed 'H' in 1886.

Production
Built by the Phoenix Foundry, Ballarat in 1877/78. Design was similar to the 1874 K class and 1877 G class in both power and weight, but with driving wheels of 5 feet diameter instead of 4 feet. One strange feature was the inexplicably small grate area. Four-wheeled tenders with a 7-foot wheelbase were fitted.

Regular service
H150 was noted as being in motor service in 1908.

Design improvements

Accidents
26 January 1881 - H160 in accident at Beaufort.
1889 - H152 broke driving axle.

Withdrawal
All the locomotives were removed from the Victorian Railways register between 1905 and 1916. The boiler of H156 went to Bendigo shed in 1912.
H130 was sold to Trawalla and Waterloo Tramway for £600 on 31 May 1909 and was later sold to Smith and Timms, SA in 1912. Last seen at Mile End, SA in 1922

Fleet summary

Model Railways

References

Specific

4-4-0 locomotives
Railway locomotives introduced in 1877
Victorian Railways H class steam (1877)
Broad gauge locomotives in Australia
H class steam (1877)
Phoenix locomotives